Jakub Wierzchowski (born 15 April 1977) is a Polish former footballer who played as a goalkeeper. He is the goalkeeping coach of Górnik Łęczna.

Club career
Wierzchowski played in the Bundesliga for SV Werder Bremen.

In January 2008, he joined Górnik Łęczna. He extended his contract to summer 2011 in June 2009.

International career
Wierzchowski was a part of Poland national team for which he made two appearances.

Honours
Wisła Kraków
 Ekstraklasa: 1998–99

References

External links
 
 

1977 births
Living people
Sportspeople from Lublin
Association football goalkeepers
Polish footballers
Poland international footballers
KS Lublinianka players
Górnik Łęczna players
Wisła Kraków players
Ruch Chorzów players
SV Werder Bremen players
Wisła Płock players
Zagłębie Sosnowiec players
Polonia Bytom players